Daniele Bracciali and Jocelyn Robichaud were the defending champions, but both turned 18 years old during the season and, therefore, were unable to compete in Juniors.

Luis Horna and Nicolás Massú defeated Jaco van der Westhuizen and Wesley Whitehouse in the final, 6–4, 6–2 to win the boys' doubles tennis title at the 1996 Wimbledon Championships. It was the 2nd Grand Slam title for Horna and the 1st Grand Slam title for Massú in their respective junior doubles careers.

Seeds

  Luis Horna /  Nicolás Massú (champions)
  Jaco van der Westhuizen /  Wesley Whitehouse (final)
  Jérôme Haehnel /  Julien Jeanpierre (first round)
  David Sherwood /  James Trotman (first round)

Draw

Draw

References

External links

Boys' Doubles
Wimbledon Championship by year – Boys' doubles